Rimkai is a village in Jonava district municipality, Kaunas County, central Lithuania. According to the 2001 census, the village has a population of 80 people. The village has a church of Old Believers.

References

External links
 

Villages in Jonava District Municipality